The Formosa 2 Offshore Wind Farm is a 376 MW offshore wind power station under construction in Miaoli County, Taiwan.

History
Jan De Nul was awarded the engineering, procurement, and construction contract for the foundation and subsea cable installation in June 2019. In July 2019, Seajacks International was subcontracted by Siemens Gamesa for the wind turbines transportation and installation and LS Cable & System was subcontracted by Jan De Nul for the supply of 130 km submarine cable. Sembcorp Marine Offshore Platforms and Saipem were subcontracted by Jan De Nul to fabricate jacket foundations in September 2019 and November 2019 respectively. In October 2019, Seaway 7 was subcontracted by Jan De Nul to transport and install the jacket foundations in October 2019.

The financial close for the project was made in October 2019. The onshore construction works started in December 2019 and the offshore construction works started in the first half of 2020.

Architecture
The wind farm is located 9.5 km offshore of Miaoli County.

Technical specifications
The wind farm will consists of 47 generating units. Each of its turbine will have 167 meter diameter rotor and 81.5 meter blade, with a swept area of 21,900 m2. It will have a rated capacity of 8 MW.

See also
 Renewable energy in Taiwan
 Electricity sector in Taiwan

References

External links
 

Buildings and structures in Miaoli County
Buildings and structures under construction in Taiwan
Wind farms in Taiwan